The William Burt House in Beaver, Utah was built in 1875.  It was listed on the National Register of Historic Places in 1983.

Its original portion is a black rock (basalt) hall and parlor house.

References

Houses on the National Register of Historic Places in Utah
Houses completed in 1875
Houses in Beaver County, Utah
National Register of Historic Places in Beaver County, Utah